The Turkey women's national rugby league team represents Turkey in women's rugby league football. Their governing body is the Turkish Rugby League Association.

Results

Upcoming Fixtures

See also

 Rugby league in Turkey
 Turkey national rugby league team

References

External links

R
Women's national rugby league teams